Panola County is a county located in the U.S. state of Mississippi. As of the 2020 census, the population was 33,208. Its county seats are Sardis and Batesville. The county is located just east of the Mississippi Delta in the northern part of the state. It is bisected by the Tallahatchie River flowing to the southwest; travel difficulties because of the river resulted in two county seats being established.

Panola is the anglicization of ponolo, a word meaning "thread" in both old Choctaw and Chickasaw and "cotton" in modern Choctaw. This was one of twelve large counties organized from the Chickasaw Cession of 1832.

History
Following forced removal of most of the historic Chickasaw tribe to territory west of the Mississippi River, Panola County was established February 9, 1836 by the state legislature. It is one of the twelve large northern Mississippi counties created that year from the territory of the Chickasaw Cession of 1832. The original act defined its limits as follows:

By 1920 the county had a population of 27,845. Its inhabitants gradually increased in numbers from 1850 to 1910, from 11,444 to 31,274, reaching a peak of population in 1940. Through this period the area was based on agriculture. From then until 1980, population declined markedly, as many African Americans moved west and north in the second wave of the Great Migration, to take jobs on the West Coast in the burgeoning defense industry. Whites also left the rural area. In 2020, the county was 48.3% African American and 47.1% white.

Starting in 1803, sixteenth sections in each township in Mississippi were established for school purposes. These sections of land were to be used exclusively for school projects. In essence, schools were later founded on land that had been Chickasaw territory.

Two of the oldest settlements in Panola County were at Belmont and Panola, which were a few miles apart and located on opposite sides of the Tallahatchie River. For several years there was a spirited contest between these two towns to gain the county court of Panola County. 

With the advent of the Mississippi and Tennessee (now the Illinois Central railroad), Belmont was absorbed by Sardis, and Panola was absorbed by Batesville. The legislature authorized two judicial districts for the county, with Sardis designated as the seat of justice for the first judicial district, and Batesville for the second judicial district.

Early education
During the early period of county formation, most education was done at home. There was no public education, and only wealthier families hired tutors or sent their sons to seminaries or academies. The informal education consisted of basic math, basic reading, and study of biblical concepts. Through the antebellum period, the state generally forbade education of slaves and free people of color.

By 1840 four small private schools with a combined student population of 92 pupils were operating in the county. Documentation has not survived about these schools. During the early 1840s, the first school‑related advertisements were published r in the county newspapers. The ads attempted to present the virtues of these early schools.

During this period, Judge James S.B. Thacher, a highly educated Bostonian, devised a popular educational program for the state of Mississippi. The proposed scheme received considerable discussion and was finally incorporated by the state legislature (4 March 1846) into "An Act to establish a System of Common Schools."

The act "provided for a board of five school commissioners in each county, to license teachers and have charge of schools, lease the school lands and have charge of the school funds in each county." To a large degree, this act was passed because A.G. Brown, a candidate for Mississippi governor, decided to make the establishment of a general school system a campaign issue. By 1846, Governor Brown (1844‑48), succeeded in getting the Act passed.

Schools established under this rule "had no uniformity since they differed as the counties differed in wealth and efficiency of management." 

Although the Act had proved to be of little assistance in Panola County, progress was being made for wealthier white students. By 1850, the seventh census in Panola County listed 18 schools and a total student population of 439 pupils (approximately four times that of the 1840 census). This census (unpublished returns) recorded that 18 individuals stated their occupation as educators or teachers. By the spring of 1854, several members of the local Shiloh community (Capt Thomas F. Wilson, Dr H. Moseley, and Jesse Smith) constructed a small log cabin to be used as the community's school house.

This school, known as the Jones' School, at first employed only one teacher. It slowly grew in size and popularity. Several years later, the facility was moved to Peach Creek, where the school was informally known as the "Greasy Smith Schoolhouse," being named for the local village blacksmith. In 1882, the facility was moved to Pleasant Grove.

Geography

Major highways
  Interstate 55
  U.S. Route 51
  Mississippi Highway 3
  Mississippi Highway 6
  Mississippi Highway 35
  U.S. Route 278

Adjacent counties
 Tunica County (northwest)
 Tate County (north)
 Lafayette County (east)
 Yalobusha County (southeast)
 Tallahatchie County (southwest)
 Quitman County (west)

Demographics

2020 census

As of the 2020 United States Census, there were 33,208 people, 12,488 households, and 8,512 families residing in the county.

2010 census
As of the 2010 United States Census, there were 34,707 people living in the county. 49.4% were White, 48.6% Black or African American, 0.2% Native American, 0.2% Asian, 0.6% of some other race and 0.9% of two or more races. 1.4% were Hispanic or Latino (of any race).

2000 census
As of the census of 2000, there were 34,274 people, 12,232 households, and 9,014 families living in the county. The population density was 50 people per square mile (19/km2). There were 13,736 housing units at an average density of 20 per square mile (8/km2). The racial makeup of the county was 50.48% White, 48.36% Black or African American, 0.16% Native American, 0.18% Asian, 0.01% Pacific Islander, 0.41% from other races, and 0.39% from two or more races. 1.12% of the population were Hispanic or Latino of any race.

There were 12,232 households, out of which 36.10% had children under the age of 18 living with them, 48.90% were married couples living together, 19.90% had a female householder with no husband present, and 26.30% were non-families. 23.20% of all households were made up of individuals, and 10.10% had someone living alone who was 65 years of age or older. The average household size was 2.75 and the average family size was 3.25.

In the county, the population was spread out, with 29.40% under the age of 18, 10.40% from 18 to 24, 27.40% from 25 to 44, 20.80% from 45 to 64, and 12.10% who were 65 years of age or older. The median age was 33 years. For every 100 females there were 91.80 males. For every 100 females age 18 and over, there were 86.50 males.

The median income for a household in the county was $26,785, and the median income for a family was $32,675. Males had a median income of $27,359 versus $19,088 for females. The per capita income for the county was $13,075. About 21.20% of families and 25.30% of the population were below the poverty line, including 32.30% of those under age 18 and 25.20% of those age 65 or over.

Government
In presidential elections, Panola County is a swing county. Donald Trump won the county in 2020, with 51.6 percent to Joe Biden's 47.4 percent.

The county's Board of Supervisors are elected from five districts. They hire a county administrator to manage daily affairs.

Education
The elected school board selects the school superintendent. School districts include:
 North Panola School District
 South Panola School District

Communities

City
 Batesville (county seat)

Towns
 Como
 Courtland
 Crenshaw (partly in Quitman County)
 Crowder (mostly in Quitman County)
 Sardis (county seat)

Village
 Pope

Unincorporated communities
 Askew
 Ballentine
 Curtis Station
 Glenville
 Horatio
 Locke Station
 Longtown
 Pleasant Grove

See also

 National Register of Historic Places listings in Panola County, Mississippi
 Panola Partnership website
 "We Ain't What We Was", a book about the changes in the county's politics after the Civil Rights Era

References

 Carl Edwin Lindgren. 1994. Panola Remembers: Education in a Southern Community. N.E. Morris Publishing Co. Also on-line at Panola Remembers.

External links
 Panola County Sheriff's Office

 
Mississippi counties
Mississippi placenames of Native American origin
Counties of Appalachia
1836 establishments in Mississippi
Populated places established in 1836
Majority-minority counties in Mississippi